Ukwa is a minor Ibibio-Efik language of Nigeria.

References

Ibibio-Efik languages
Languages of Nigeria